Down Home with the Neelys is a Food Network show hosted by Patrick and Gina Neely.  The show depicts the Neelys sharing dishes and recipes.  Taped in their Memphis home, the show, which has a relaxed demeanor, now airs seven days a week on Food Network. The Entertainment Network announced in September,  2014 that the couple would divorce after 20 years of marriage.  The fate of the company remains unknown.

After its February 2008 premiere, the show became the highest-rated series debut in the five-year history of Food Network's "In the Kitchen" weekend block and continues to be a top ratings performer.

Cooking style
Gina and Pat Neely are known for their Southern cooking, typically barbecue.

External links 
Down Home with the Neelys on The Food Network

Food Network original programming
2000s American cooking television series
2008 American television series debuts